Crossing the Border, also known as Crossing Borders is a 2006 Spanish comedy-drama film directed by Carlos Iglesias, who also stars in alongside Javier Gutiérrez, Nieve de Medina and .

Plot 
Set in the 1960s, the plot concerns the economic migration of two Spaniards from Spain to Switzerland.

Cast

Production 
The screenplay was penned by Carlos Iglesias with the collaboration of 'Central de Guiones'. The film was produced by Drive Cine and Adivina Producciones, with the participation of TVE.

Release 
The film screened at the 9th Málaga Film Festival's main competition in March 2006. Distributed by Alta Classics, it was theatrically released in Spain on 5 May 2006.

Reception 
Jonathan Holland of Variety wrote that "combining gentle comedy, social crit and sentimentality into an enjoyable and surprisingly spiky whole", the film "is a traditional heartwarmer with enough contempo edge to keep it from looking merely old-fashioned", also noting the "exuberant" performances.

Mirito Torreiro of Fotogramas rated the film 3 out of 5 stars, assessing that while it is a tad too tearjerking, yet it is also effective and honest, also pointing out "at its unusual narrative solidity and a superb technical craft".

Accolades 

|-
| align = "center" rowspan = "18" | 2007 || rowspan = "2" | 62nd CEC Medals || colspan = "2" | Best Film ||  || align = "center" rowspan = "2" | 
|-
| Best Original Screenplay || Carlos Iglesias || 
|-
| 21st Goya Awards || Best New Director || Carlos Iglesias ||  || 
|-
| rowspan = "15" | 5th Mestre Mateo Awards || colspan = "2" | Best Film ||  || rowspan = "15" | 
|-
| Best Director || Carlos Iglesias || 
|-
| Best Actor || Carlos Iglesias || 
|-
| rowspan = "2" | Best Actress || Isabel Blanco || 
|-
| Nieve de Medina || 
|-
| Best Supporting Actor || Miguel de Lira || 
|-
| Best Supporting Actress || Feli Manzano || 
|-
| Best Screenplay || Carlos Iglesias || 
|-
| Best Score || Mario de Benito || 
|-
| Best Cinematography || Tote Trenas || 
|-
| Best Editing || Luisma del Valle || 
|-
| Best Production Supervision || Jesús Alonso || 
|-
| Best Art Direction || Enrique Fayanás || 
|-
| Best Makeup and Haistyles || Óscar Aramburo, Sara Márquez || 
|-
| Best Costume Design || José María de Cossío, Puy Uche || 
|}

See also 
 List of Spanish films of 2006

References 

Films set in Spain
Films set in Switzerland
Films set in the 1960s
2006 comedy-drama films
Spanish comedy-drama films
2000s Spanish-language films
Films about immigration to Europe
2000s Spanish films